= Aslı Ağırbaş =

Turkish architect

Aslı Ağırbaş is an architect. She is known for her futuristic works.
